Dathran Al Alwi is a sub-district located in Maswarah District, Al Bayda Governorate, Yemen.  Dathran Al Alwi had a population of 2769 according to the 2004 census.

References 

Sub-districts in Maswarah District